Pavel Kazankov (30 June 1926 – 19 January 2018) was a Soviet racewalker. He competed in the men's 50 kilometres walk at the 1952 Summer Olympics. He died on 19 January 2018 at the age of 91.

References

1926 births
2018 deaths
Athletes (track and field) at the 1952 Summer Olympics
Soviet male racewalkers
Olympic athletes of the Soviet Union
Sportspeople from Ufa